Roma is a 2018 drama film written and directed by Alfonso Cuarón. Cuarón also produced, co-edited and photographed the film. It stars Yalitza Aparicio, Marina de Tavira, Marco Graf, Daniela Demesa, Enoc Leaño and Daniel Valtierra. Set in the early 1970s, the film is a semi-biographical take on Cuarón's upbringing in Mexico City, and follows the life of a live-in housekeeper to an upper-middle-class family. The title refers to the Colonia Roma district of the city.

Accolades

Notes

See also
 2018 in film

References

External links 
 

Lists of accolades by film